Patrik Křap (born 13 March 1981) is a Czech footballer, who currently plays for SV Gaflenz as a defender.

Career
Křap began playing football for the youth side of 1. FC Brno. He joined the senior side in the summer of 2000, and would make 46 league appearances for the club over four seasons. In the 2005 winter break, he left for FC Hradec Králové, but returned to play for Brno's B side after just six months. In January 2006, Křap moved to Austria to play for Union Perg.

He has represented his country at youth levels.

External links
 
 
 
 Patrik Křap at ÖFB

1981 births
Living people
Czech footballers
Czech expatriate footballers
Czech Republic youth international footballers
Czech Republic under-21 international footballers
Czech First League players
FC Zbrojovka Brno players
FC Hradec Králové players
SK Líšeň players
SK Moravská Slavia Brno players
Czech expatriate sportspeople in Austria
Expatriate footballers in Austria

Association football defenders